Mitch Tawhi Thomas (Ngāti Maniapoto) is a New Zealand playwright, actor and drama teacher.

Education 
Thomas affiliates to Ngāti Maniapoto. Thomas graduated from Toi Whakaari: NZ Drama School in 1997 with a Diploma in Acting.

Career 
Tawhi Thomas is principally a playwright although he has also appeared in a number of plays as an actor to critical acclaim. Shakespearean roles he has played include 'Cobweb' in Midsummers Nights Dream directed by David O'Donnell at the Dell, Wellington Botanic Gardens in 1991, and 'John of Gaunt' in King Richard II directed by David O'Donnell and Rachel Lenart at Studio 77, Victoria University of Wellington in 2009. 

In 2010 Mitch worked at Centrepoint Theatre in Palmerston North, running drama workshops with teenagers in the Basement Company over five months writing a play with them called Smashed. In 2021, Mitch is the Senior Acting Tutor at Toi Whakaari. He appeared at the Auckland Writers Festival in 2018.

Tawhi Thomas's play from 2001 Have Car Will Travel depicts "the collision of white trash with brown trash" according to director Rachel House. Tawhi Thomas was appointed writer in residence at Waikato University in 2003. Jangle (2010) had in the cast musician Jhan Lindsay. Critic John Smythe described the play as a "bizarre black comedy", and Pakaru (2019) is described as a "poignant tragedy about our hard-working, hilarious whānau".

Awards 
In 2001 Thomas received The Absolutely Positively Outstanding New New Zealand Play of the Year at the Chapman Tripp Theatre Awards for his thriller Have Car Will Travel. This play also won Best Director for Rachel House in the Chapman Trip Theatre Awards and the New Zealand Listener awards.

In 2002 he was awarded the Bruce Mason Playwriting Award.

Thomas won the Adam New Zealand Play Award in 2012 for Hui. Hui premiered with Silo Theatre at the Auckland Arts Festival in 2013.

His play Pakaru won five awards at the 2019 Wellington Theatre Awards. It premiered at the Kia Mau Festival in 2019. Pakaru also won the Adam New Zealand Play Award, making Thomas was the first playwright to win the award twice. Both Hui and Pakaru also won Best Play by a Māori Playwright.

Published works 

 Have Car Will Travel (Wellington: Tawata, 2010)

References

External links 
Interview with Lynn Freeman, Radio New Zealand, after winning the 2019 Adam New Zealand Play Award.
The Imaginary Lives of Jim Pōneke, by Tina Makareti, told by Mitch Tawhi Thomas. Via Radio New Zealand.

Living people
Year of birth missing (living people)
New Zealand dramatists and playwrights
New Zealand actors
Ngāti Maniapoto people
Toi Whakaari alumni